Hanko Airfield is the southernmost airfield in Finland.

See also
List of airports in Finland

References

External links
 Hangon Lentokerho ry (Hanko Flying Club) 
 VFR Suomi/Finland – Hanko Airfield
 Lentopaikat.net – Hanko Airfield 

Airports in Finland
Aifield
Buildings and structures in Uusimaa